NVC community W1 (Salix cinerea - Galium palustre woodland) is one of the woodland communities in the British National Vegetation Classification system; it is one of seven woodland communities in the NVC classed as "wet woodlands".

This is a community with a widely scattered distribution in the lowlands of Britain. There are no subcommunities.

Community composition

Two constant species are found in this community, Grey Willow (Salix cinerea) and Common Marsh-bedstraw (Galium palustre). 

One rare species, Tufted Loosestrife (Lysimachia thyrsiflora) is also associated with the community.

Distribution

This community is widely distributed in the lowlands of Britain.

References

 Rodwell, J. S. (1991) British Plant Communities Volume 1 - Woodlands and scrub  (hardback),  (paperback)

W01